Season nineteen of the television program American Experience originally aired on the PBS network in the United States on October 2, 2006 and concluded on May 14, 2007.  The season contained 15 new episodes and began with the first two parts of the Eyes on the Prize miniseries, "Awakenings (1954–1956)" and "Fighting Back (1957–1962)".  The first six parts of the 14-part miniseries were a rebroadcast of the production originally shown during 1987 on PBS.  "The Mormons" film was co-produced with the PBS documentary program Frontline.

Episodes

 Denotes multiple chapters that aired on the same date and share the same episode number

References

2006 American television seasons
2007 American television seasons
American Experience